Anthony Patrick O'Gorman (born 13 March 1958) is a former Australian politician. He was a Labor Party member of the Western Australian Legislative Assembly from February 2001 to March 2013, representing the constituency of Joondalup. His daughter, Jessica Stojkovski, currently represents Kingsley in the Assembly.

References

1958 births
Living people
Members of the Western Australian Legislative Assembly
Australian Labor Party members of the Parliament of Western Australia
21st-century Australian politicians